Alyaksandr Uladzimiravich Yermakovich (born 21 January 1975) is a Belarusian football manager and a former midfielder. He is an assistant coach of Russian club Ural Yekaterinburg.

Coaching career
Since 2008 he has been an assistant coach in BATE Borisov, and in October 2013 he was appointed as the team's head coach. On 9 January 2018, he was hired as an assistant coach at PFC CSKA Moscow, joining former BATE manager Viktor Goncharenko whom Yermakovich had already assisted at the Belarusian club. In April 2021, he moved with Goncharenko to FC Krasnodar. On 5 January 2022, Krasnodar fired Goncharenko and his assistants, including Yermakovich. On 18 August 2022, Yermakovich rejoined Goncharenko at Ural Yekaterinburg.

Honours

Player
BATE Borisov
Belarusian Premier League champion: 1999, 2002, 2006, 2007, 2008
Belarusian Cup winner: 2005–06

Coach
BATE Borisov
Belarusian Premier League champion: 2013, 2014, 2015, 2016
Belarusian Cup winner: 2014–15
Belarusian Super Cup winner: 2014, 2015, 2016

References

External links
 Profile on BATE official website

1975 births
Living people
Belarusian footballers
FC BATE Borisov players
FC Dinamo-93 Minsk players
FC Ataka Minsk players
Belarusian football managers
FC BATE Borisov managers
Belarusian expatriate football managers
Expatriate football managers in Russia
Association football midfielders